The upland antshrike (Thamnophilus aroyae) is a species of bird in the family Thamnophilidae.

It is found in the eastern Andes of Bolivia and southeastern Peru.

Its natural habitats are subtropical or tropical moist montane forests and heavily degraded former forest.

References

upland antshrike
Birds of the Puna grassland
upland antshrike
Taxonomy articles created by Polbot